Fritton is a village and former civil parish in county of Norfolk, England. In 1961 the parish had a population of 192.

History
The origins of Fritton's name is uncertain, and it either derives from the Old English for a settlement of refuge or safety or an amalgamation of the Old English and Old Norse for Frithi's settlement or village.

In the Domesday Book, Fritton is listed as a settlement of 63 households in the hundred of Depwade. In 1086, the village was divided between the East Anglian estates of Robert Malet, Roger Bigod of Norfolk, Bury St Edmunds Abbey, Ralph Baynard and Robert, son of Corbucion.

Caldecott Hall was built as a manor-house in the Fifteenth Century and belonged to the family of Sir John Fastolf, the basis of William Shakespeare's John Falstaff. The Paston Letters record the bitter struggle between the Paston and Debenham families over the inheritance of Caldecott Hall.

During the Second World War, Fritton Lake was requisitioned by the 79th Armoured Division for the secret training of DD Amphibious tanks in preparation for the Normandy landings. Between 1943 and 1945, over 2,000 men from the British, Canadian and American Armies were trained on Fritton Lake.

Today the village forms part of the civil parish of Fritton and St. Olaves, which in turn is within the district of Great Yarmouth in Norfolk. However prior to the Local Government Act 1972, the village was within Lothingland Rural District in Suffolk. The parish of Fritton was abolished on 1 April 1974 to form "Fritton and St. Olaves".

Geography
Fritton falls within the constituency of Great Yarmouth and is represented at Parliament by Brandon Lewis MP of the Conservative Party. For the purposes of local government, the parish falls within the district of Great Yarmouth.

St. Edmund's Church
Fritton's church is dedicated to Saint Edmund and is one of Norfolk's 124 remaining Anglo-Saxon round-tower churches. The church has good examples of Twentieth Century stained-glass depicting various saints alongside a rare early-Medieval wall drawing depicting the life of Saint Edmund, which was recovered in 1967.

Fritton Lake

Fritton Lake is one of the largest lakes in East Anglia and is located close to Fritton. The lake is part of the estates of Somerleyton Hall.

References

External Links

St Edmund's on the European Round Tower Churches website

Villages in Norfolk
Former civil parishes in Norfolk
Borough of Great Yarmouth